Pub cheese is a type of soft cheese spread and dip prepared using cheese as a primary ingredient and usually with some type of beer or ale added. It can be made with smoked cheeses or liquid smoke added to impart a smoky flavor.  It is typically served with crackers or vegetables, whereby the cheese is spread onto these foods, or the foods may be dipped in it. It is also used as a topping on sandwiches, such as hamburgers. Pub cheese is a traditional bar snack in the United States.

Pub cheese is sometimes prepared using a mix of processed cheese and pure cheese.

It is a mass-produced product in the United States. For example, Président is a brand that includes pub cheese in its line, and Trader Joe's has a store brand of pub cheese.

Some bars, breweries, public houses and restaurants produce their own versions of pub cheese.

See also

 List of spreads
 Beer cheese
 Double Gloucester – sometimes referred to as "pub cheese"
 Pimento cheese
 Port wine cheese
 Pub grub

References

Further reading
 

Cheese dishes
Spreads (food)